Marry the Boss's Daughter is a 1941 American comedy film directed by Thornton Freeland and written by Jack Andrews. The film stars Brenda Joyce, Bruce Edwards, George Barbier, Hardie Albright, Ludwig Stössel and Bodil Rosing. The film was released on November 28, 1941, by 20th Century Fox.

Plot
Jefferson Cole moves in to New York City looking for a job, he fails to find a job, but finds a lost dog, he discovers that the dog belongs to Fredericka Barrett and returns it to her. She takes a liking to Cole and gets her businessman father J.W. Barrett to offer a job to Cole.

Cast  
 
Brenda Joyce as Fredericka Barrett
Bruce Edwards as Jefferson Cole
George Barbier as J.W. Barrett
Hardie Albright as Putnam Palmer
Ludwig Stössel as Franz Polgar
Bodil Rosing as Mrs. Polgar
Brandon Tynan as Mr. Dawson
Charles Arnt as Blodgett
George Meeker as Snavely
Frank McGlynn, Sr. as Hoffman
Eula Guy as Miss Simpson
Ray Walker as Elevator Operator
Adrian Morris as Subway Guard

References

External links 
 

1941 films
20th Century Fox films
American comedy films
1941 comedy films
Films directed by Thornton Freeland
American black-and-white films
1940s English-language films
1940s American films